.tv (formerly The Computer Channel, pronounced as Dot TV and referred to on-screen as .tv - the technology channel) was a British television channel dedicated to technology. .tv was owned and operated by British Sky Broadcasting. The channel first broadcast on 1 September 1996 and broadcast between 18:00 and 20:00. The broadcasting hours were increased to midday-midnight when the channel started broadcasting on British Sky Broadcasting's digital satellite platform, Sky Digital in 1998. In 1999 the channel interviewed then Microsoft CEO Bill Gates.

Towards the end of its run, .tv implemented several new shows heavily sponsored by online technology store dabs.com, promoting products which were available at that site. .tv was closed on 2 September 2001 because of low audience ratings. Most of the programmes were produced by Hewland International.

Programming 
 Buyers Guide - 20 minute weekday show that reviewed gadgets (such as PDAs and printers), computers and software (such as video games, operating systems and photo manipulation).  Presented by Will Hanrahan. Guests included: Lydia Jones, Chris Long, and Ashley Jones.
 Chips with Everything - 20-minute weekday show presented by Kate Russell with guests trying to answer computer-related questions that were sent in by viewers. Guests included: Roger Gann, James Morris, Simon Smart, Nigel Whitfield, Guy Clapperton, and Charles Bocock.
 Ex Machina - 30-minute weekly show that went behind the scenes of digitally produced entertainment (video games, films and television programmes).
 Game Over (originally Games World) - variable-format video game magazine show. The show was presented by Andy Collins and co-presented by Matt Berry, Richard Pitt, Helen Hartley & Kellie Priestley. In November 2000, Matt Cuttle took over as the sole presenter. 
 Games Republic - A question-based video game quiz show, presented by Trevor and Simon.
 404 Not Found - An offbeat news and reviews show with regular viewer letters and emails, written and hosted by Dave Green and Danny O’Brien, with additional script-writing by James Wallis.
 Global Village - 30-minute weekly show that looked at how technology was revolutionising our homes from an international perspective. Presented by Will Hanrahan 
 Masterclass - 20-minute weekday show that gave tutorials on how to use features from programs like Microsoft Word, Adobe Photoshop and Nero Burning ROM. For the majority of the run, the show was presented by Richard Topping, affectionately known as "Toppers." He left the show to pursue a successful career in writing. His replacement was comedian Marc Haynes, who fronted the show until the channel closed.
 Nexus - A puzzle game show hosted by Brian Blessed

Buyers Guide, Masterclass and Chips with Everything were repeated as omnibus editions (the weekday editions broadcast as one programme) on weekends.

See also
 XLEAGUE.TV
 Game Network
 TechTV
 G4

References

External links
 Archived website
 Videogame coverage-centric potted history of the channel
Imdb page for an episode of Buyers Guide including Bryn Firkins

Defunct television channels in the United Kingdom
Sky television channels
Computer television series
Television channels and stations established in 1996
Television channels and stations disestablished in 2001